Savage Beach is a 1989 action adventure film written and directed by Andy Sidaris and starring Dona Speir, Hope Marie Carlton, John Aprea, Bruce Penhall. It is the fourth installment in the Triple B series.

Cast
 Dona Speir as Donna
 Hope Marie Carlton as Taryn
 John Aprea as Captain Andreas
 Bruce Penhall as Bruce Christian

Release
Savage Beach was shown theatrically on October 13, 1989 in New York.

Reception
From contemporary reviews, "Lor." of Variety declared the film to be a "entertaining action pic" stating that "Filmmaker Andy Sidaris ensures that most of the action is campy fun with his oddball dialog and predilection for having the female cast strip in the least likely situations." concluding that "Action fans who favor a tongue-in-cheek approach will enjoy this one."

See also
Girls with guns

References

Sources

External links

 Trailer for Savage Beach

1989 films
1980s action adventure films
American independent films
American spy action films
Films set on islands
Films directed by Andy Sidaris
American action adventure films
1989 independent films
1980s spy films
1980s English-language films
1980s American films